Philip I, Count of Waldeck (1445–1475) was briefly Count of Waldeck-Waldeck in Germany in 1475.

He was the son of Count Wolrad I and his wife Barbara of Wertheim.  He inherited the County of Waldeck when his father died in 1475, and died himself later that year.  Nothing remarkable happened during his brief reign.

In 1464, he married Joanne, the daughter of Count John IV of Nassau-Siegen.  They had one son: Henry VIII.

References 
 Adolph Theodor Ludwig Varnhagen: Grundlage der Waldeckischen Landes- und Regentengeschichte, vol. 2, Arolsen, 1853, p. 39 ff

Counts of Waldeck
1445 births
1475 deaths
15th-century German people